Tatineni Prakash Rao (24 November 1924 – 1 July 1992) was an Indian film director and screenwriter who worked in Telugu, Hindi, and Tamil films. In a career spanning nearly four decades, he directed over 40 films.

He started his career as an assistant director for films like Palnati Yuddham (1947), Shavukaru (1950), Pathala Bhairavi (1951). He debuted as a director with the Telugu film Palletooru (1952) and later directed Pichi Pullayya (1953), Parivartana (1954), Jayam Manade (1956), Charana Daasi (1956), Illarikam (1959) in Telugu. In Hindi, he directed films like Sasural (1961), Suraj (1966), Izzat (1968) and Duniya (1968). His notable Tamil films include Amara Deepam (1956), Uthama Puthiran (1958), Nalla Theerpu (1959), and Padagotti (1964).

Early life 
Tatineni Prakash Rao was born in Kapileswarapuram of Krishna district in present-day Andhra Pradesh. He was a member of the CPI before Indian Independence and was associated with Praja Natya Mandali, a radical theatre movement.

Career 
Later, Prakash Rao moved to Madras to join the film industry like many others who did not the like the turn of events in the Communist movement. He started his career as an assistant to L. V. Prasad for films like Palnati Yuddham (1947), Mana Desam (1949), Shavukaru (1950), Samsaram (1950). He also worked with K. V. Reddy for some time on Pathala Bhairavi (1951). He debuted as a director with the Telugu film Palletooru (1952).

Personal life 
Prakash Rao's wife Tatineni Annapurna (b. 1930) died on May 10, 2021 in Vijayawada at the age of 91 due to COVID-19.

His son T. L. V. Prasad is a film director while his daughter Leela settled in the US. Prakash Rao's grandson Tatineni Satya is also a film director who debuted with Bheemili Kabaddi Jattu (2010). Noted director Tatineni Rama Rao is a cousin brother of Prakash Rao. Rama Rao worked as an assistant director to Prakash Rao in the beginning of his career.

Filmography
As a director

As an assistant director

References

External links

1924 births
1992 deaths
Film directors from Andhra Pradesh
20th-century Indian film directors
Telugu film directors
Hindi-language film directors
Tamil film directors